Another Miss Oh is a South Korean television series starring Eric Mun, Seo Hyun-jin, Jeon Hye-bin. It replaced Pied Piper and broadcast on cable network tvN on Mondays and Tuesdays at 23:00 (KST) time slot for 18 episodes from May 2 to June 28, 2016.

The series recorded the highest audience rating for a tvN Monday-Tuesday show and became one of the highest-rated Korean dramas in cable television history. The drama was extended by 2 episodes and 2 specials.

Synopsis
Park Do-kyung (Eric Mun) is a sound director in his 30s. A year ago, his bride, Oh Hae-young (pretty) (Jeon Hye-bin), disappeared on their wedding day leaving him miserable. One year after that incident, Do-kyung was told that Hae-young is going to marry a young entrepreneur named Han Tae-jin (Lee Jae-yoon). Do-kyung exacted revenge by sabotaging Tae-jin's business leaving him bankrupt. However, the woman who has the name Oh Hae-young (just/"그냥") (Seo Hyun-jin) was actually just a stranger who coincidentally has the same name as the other Oh Hae-young (pretty) who left him.

Coincidentally, Oh Hae-young (just) is the girl that Do-kyung had been seeing lately in his visions, and he sees snapshots of the future with her in it.

Tae-jin was soon to be sent to jail due to bankruptcy, and hence before his imprisonment he meets his fiancée, Hae-young (just), and tells her that he doesn't love her enough to marry her and wants to call off their wedding. Truthfully, Tae-jin was lying and his true intentions was to let her go so that she will gain happiness.

Amidst all of this, Do-kyung and Hae-young (just)'s lives turn as they cross paths. After sharing similar unfortunate experiences of being dumped before their weddings, the two of them got even closer. Will Do-kyung start to fall in love with Hae-young (just)? But, will Hae-young (just) look at Do-kyung the same way when she finds out that he is the one who ruined her wedding? Is it a love story between two people who should not be destined to be together? Or will Do-kyung's visions of her actually prove that they are meant for each other?

Cast

Main
 Eric Mun as Park Do-kyung 
 A 36-year-old man, he is a sound director. He has a very reserved and aloof personality and is intimate and meticulous with his work. He is unable to forget his ex-girlfriend, Oh Hae-young (pretty), who disappeared on the day of their wedding. After he mistook Oh Hae-young (just) for Hae-young (pretty), Do-kyung keeps seeing visions that are always related to Hae-young (just) as if he sees the future. He falls in love with Hae-young (just) but knows he doesn't deserve her, because he was the one who ruined her wedding with her ex-fiancé, Han Tae-jin.
 Seo Hyun-jin as Oh Hae-young (just/"그냥")
 A 32-year-old woman, she is a product planning team representative of the catering division of her company. Her life got ruined after her ex-fiancé Tae-jin dumped her the day before their wedding, and as a result she becomes the main topic of gossip because of it. She describes herself as a pitiful and unlucky person but is cheered up by Do-kyung and eventually becomes attracted to him. Meanwhile, she is clueless that Do-kyung is the person who ruined her wedding. Because she shares her name with the beautiful and perfect Oh Hae-young (pretty), she is always compared and feels small.
 Jeon Hye-bin as Oh Hae-young (pretty)
 A 32-year-old woman, she is the TF team leader of the catering division Oh Hae-young (just) works in. She also is Do-kyung's ex-lover who ditched their wedding and left for Europe. After one year, she still loves him and decided to come back to him. She comes from a wealthy family with many marriage issues, where her mother and father marry and divorce back-and-forth, and has many step-siblings. She always appears cheerful in front everyone in order to hide her true self who lacks love from her parents.

Supporting

People around Park Do-kyung
 Ye Ji-won as Park Soo-kyung
 A 44-year-old woman, she is the catering division director and Do-kyung's older sister. She is an alcoholic who always babbles in French when she gets drunk and has a habit of falling for any man whom she ever sleeps with. Hae-young (just) and her other subordinates give her the nickname "Isadora" ("isa" = two four (24) and "dora" = "running around" meaning she is around at all times) because of her habit of constantly checking up on her subordinates.
 Kim Ji-seok as Lee Jin-sang
 A 36-year-old man, he is a lawyer and Do-kyung's friend. He is the first person who mistook Hae-Young (just) for Hae-young (pretty) and persuaded Do-kyung to seek revenge. He said to Do-kyung he would stay in Do-kyung's house for a while to protect himself from dangerous people that are related to the case he is handling. But in reality, he is hiding from the husband of a woman he recently seduced. 
 Heo Jung-min as Park Hoon
 A 33-year-old man, he is a sound recording studio staff and Do-kyung's younger brother. Even though they have the same last name, Do-kyung and Hoon are not actually blood-related - Do-kyung and Soo-kyung are from the maternal side, while Hoon is from the paternal side. He seems to be frustrated with his step-brother, and they don't get along with each other often and share different opinions. He always gets crazy while searching for a girlfriend.
 Nam Gi-ae as Heo Ji-ya
 A 63-year-old woman, she is a film producer and Do-kyung's mother. She is a gold-digger and only cares about living a luxurious life, and always asks Do-kyung for money even though she never pays him back. She was against Do-kyung's marriage to Hae-young (pretty) as she knew Do-kyung wouldn't give her money once he gets married. For this purpose, she emotionally and psychologically tortures Hae-young (pretty) into running away on the day of their wedding.

People around Oh Hae-young (just/"그냥") 
 Lee Jae-yoon as Han Tae-jin
 A 36-year-old man, he is an entrepreneur and Hae-young (just)'s ex-fiancé. He decides to call off their wedding and dumps Hae-young (just) in order to let her live happily. Not long after he dumped her, he went to jail because of the bankruptcy. He is curious as to why Do-kyung decided to destroy his business as they never met each other previously. Even after he walks out from jail, he still has feelings for his ex-fiancé, Hae-young (just).
 Lee Han-wi as Oh Kyung-soo 
 A 60-year-old man, he is Hae-young (just)'s father. As a man he is talented in cooking, and he seems to be more patient and calm than Hae-young (just)'s mother.
 Kim Mi-kyung as Hwang Deok-yi
 A 57-year-old woman, she is Hae-young (just)'s mother. She feels pressured after her daughter called off her wedding, as her friends in the neighborhood keep talking about her daughter behind her back. She has a weird habit of taking off her clothes when she's angry.
  as Kim Hee-ran
 She is a film producer and Hae-young (just)'s best friend. Thanks to her, Do-kyung and Hae-young (just) meet for the first time in person. She has been Hae-young (just)'s sole dependable friend since their high school days. Even though both of them are close, Hee-ran is popular with boys unlike Hae-young (just).
  as Jeong-sook
 She is Hae-young (just)'s aunt. She used to help with house work often, but after Hae-young (just) called off her marriage, she became annoying and regularly argues with Deok-yi.

People around Oh Hae-young (pretty)
 Kim Seo-ra as Hae-young (pretty)'s mother

Extended
 Heo Young-ji as Yoon Ahn-na
 A 21-year-old woman, she is a part-time staff of a convenience store and Hoon's girlfriend, and seems to not want to get married during her lifetime. She tells Hoon during their 100th day anniversary that she wants the both of them to live together, but Hoon constantly rejects her idea because they are not a married couple. 
 Kang Nam-gil as chairman Jang
 A 74-year-old man, he is a conglomerate chairman and Hae-young (pretty)'s step-father, as Hae-young (pretty)'s mother was once married to him but eventually got divorced.
 Choi Byung-mo as Park Soon-taek
 He is Do-kyung's psychiatrist and the only person who knows about Do-kyung's visions that are related to Hae-young (just). 
  as Kim Seong-jin – Hae-young (just)'s workshop colleague
 The leader of the catering division "Seasonal Table" team
  as Gi-tae
 Sound engineer
 Jo Hyun-sik as Sang-seok – sound engineer
  as Lee Joon
 Sound engineer
 Kwon Soo-hyun
 Shin Woo-gyeom as Ji-hoon
 Lee Ga-hyun as Shim Ye-jin
 Member of the catering division "Seasonal Table" team
 Yoo Se-rye as Chan-joo
 Member of the catering division "Seasonal Table" team
  as officer of the catering division
 Baek Joon as Jung Woo-sung
 Member of the catering division "Seasonal Table" team
 Kim Moon-hak as Kim Moon-hak
 Member of the catering division "Seasonal Table" team
 Hwang Chang-do as Hwang Chang-do
 Member of the catering division "Seasonal Table" team
 Jo Seong-hyuk as Hae-young's high school alumni
 Park Myung-hoon as Lee Chan-soo
 Tae-jin's friend partner
  as Jang Young-ji
 Chairman Jang's daughter

Others
 Ko Kyu-pil as Chinese restaurant's delivery man
  as Hae-young (just)'s grandmother
  as Do-kyung's house owner
  as "Divorce, Not Marriage" scenario writer, Heo Ji-ya's employee

Special appearances
  as film director (ep. 1)
 Lee Hyun-jin as Hae-young (just)'s blind date (ep. 1)
 Yoon Jong-hoon as Choi Noo-ri, Hae-young's high school alumni (ep. 2–3)
 Yeon Woo-jin as lawyer Gong Gi-tae (ep. 7)
 Im Ha-ryong as hero of the film "Another Productivity" (ep. 9)
 Lee Pil-mo as Do-kyung's father at the youth time (ep. 10)
 Lee Yu-ri as Heo Ji-ya at the youth time (ep. 10)
 Lee Byung-joon as Lee Byung-joon – singer, worry counselor (ep. 12–18)
 Kim Shin-young as Kim Shin-young – "Kim Shin-young's Morning Coffee" radio show host (ep. 12)
 Lee Sun-bin as Jin-sang's Monday girlfriend (ep. 14)
 Woo Hyun as Woo Hyeon – Park Soon-taek's senior (ep. 15–18)
 Seo Jun-young as Hae-young (pretty)'s blind date (ep. 15)
 Seo Yea-ji as Oh Seo-hee – Hae-young (just)'s younger cousin (ep. 15)
 Oh Man-seok as Oh Man-seok – film director (ep. 18)

Original soundtrack

Part 1

Part 2

Part 3

Part 4

Part 5

Part 6

Part 7

Part 8

Ratings
In this table,  represent the lowest ratings and  represent the highest ratings.

Awards and nominations

International broadcast
  – 8TV
  – Channel 7
  – VTV3 (under the local title "Vẫn là Oh Hae Young")
  – Sony One
 Southeast Asia and Sri Lanka – tvN Asia
  - ETC (under the local title: "La otra señorita Oh")
  – GMA Network (December 5, 2022 - January 20, 2023)

Notes

References

External links
  
 Another Miss Oh at Studio Dragon 
 Another Miss Oh at Chorokbaem Media 
 
 
 

TVN (South Korean TV channel) television dramas
Korean-language television shows
2016 South Korean television series debuts
2016 South Korean television series endings
South Korean romantic comedy television series
South Korean television series remade in other languages
Television series by Studio Dragon
Television series by Chorokbaem Media